John Earl may refer to:

John Earl (cricketer, born 1788)
John Earl (cricketer, born 1822)

See also
John Earle (disambiguation)